Thyrsopsocus elegans is a species of Psocoptera in the family Psocidae. It is found in Brazil.

References

External links 
 
 Thyrsopsocus elegans at insectoid.info

Insects described in 1925
Psocidae
Fauna of Brazil